The 1892–93 Scottish Cup was the 20th season of Scotland's most prestigious football knockout competition. The Cup was won by Queen's Park when they beat Celtic 2–1 in the final after a replay.

Calendar

First round

Match declared void

First round replay

Second round

Second round replay

Quarter-final

Quarter-final replay

Semi-finals

Final

Match declared void due to frozen pitch (decided pre-match after inspection, but not announced to spectators until the second half).

Final replay

The winning goal was believed by some observers not to have fully entered the goal before being cleared, and Celtic protested but the score stood. Although their use would not have resolved that particular incident, this controversy and debate led to goal nets being introduced in the latter stages of the Scottish Cup from then on.

Teams

See also
1892–93 in Scottish football

References

RSSF Scottish Cup 92-93

1892-1893
Cup
Cup